This article contains information about the literary events and publications of 1849.
—Dickens, opening of David Copperfield

Events
February – J. A. Froude's semi-autobiographical, epistolary philosophical novel of religious doubt The Nemesis of Faith is published by John Chapman in London. A copy is burned by William Sewell, Dean of Exeter College, Oxford, himself a novelist.
March–November – La Tribune des Peuples, a pan-European romantic nationalist periodical, is published by Adam Mickiewicz.
April 22 – Fyodor Dostoyevsky and fellow members of the literary Petrashevsky Circle in Russia are arrested for expressing their progressive views. Sentenced to death on November 16 and facing a firing squad on December 23, he and some others are reprieved at the last moment and exiled to the katorga prison camps in Siberia.

May 1 – Charles Dickens's Bildungsroman David Copperfield begins serial publication by Bradbury and Evans in London.
May 10 – The Astor Place Riot takes place in Manhattan over a dispute between two Shakespearean actors, the American Edwin Forrest and the Englishman William Macready. Over 20 people are killed.
May 28 – Anne Brontë dies of tuberculosis aged 29 at Scarborough on the Yorkshire coast of England, where she is buried. Until 2013, her headstone mistakenly gives her age as 28.
September 20 – Honoré de Balzac travels to Poland to meet Eveline Hanska, whom he will marry shortly before his death next year.
October 3 – Death of Edgar Allan Poe: Edgar Allan Poe is found in Baltimore delirious, "in great distress, and... in need of immediate assistance". He dies on October 7 aged 40, of an uncertain cause, in Washington College Hospital.
October–December – Thomas De Quincey's essay The English Mail-Coach appears in issues of Blackwood's Edinburgh Magazine.
November – The English scholarly correspondence magazine Notes and Queries is first published.
November 13 – The public hanging in London of Marie Manning (murderer) is attended independently by Charles Dickens and Herman Melville; Dickens writes a letter published in the following day's issue of The Times decrying the "wickedness and levity of the immense crowd".
November 14 – A public festival is held in Denmark to mark the 70th birthday of Adam Gottlob Oehlenschläger.
Uncertain dates
The Leipzig publisher B. G. Teubner begins publishing the Bibliotheca Teubneriana series of editions of the Classics.
Who's Who is published for the first time in the United Kingdom.
Philip Massinger's play Believe as You List receives its first publication, 218 years after its theatrical première.

New books

Fiction
William Harrison Ainsworth – The Lancashire Witches
Charlotte Brontë (as Currer Bell) – Shirley
François-René de Chateaubriand – Memoirs from Beyond the Grave
Charles Dickens – David Copperfield (begins serialization)
Fyodor Dostoevsky – Netochka Nezvanova
Alexandre Dumas, père – The Queen's Necklace
Paul Féval – Les Belles-de-nuit ou Les Anges de la famille
J. A. Froude – The Nemesis of Faith
Catherine Gore – The Diamond and the Pearl
Charles Kingsley – Alton Locke
Herman Melville
Mardi
Redburn
Mayne Reid – The Rifle Rangers
G. W. M. Reynolds – The Bronze Statue
George Sand – La Petite Fadette (Little Fadette)
Theodor Storm – Immensee

Children and young people
Charlotte Mary Yonge – The Railroad Children

Drama
Christian Friedrich Hebbel – Der Rubin
 John Westland Marston – Strathmore
Gaspar Núñez de Arce – Amor y Orgullo
Eugène Scribe and Ernest Legouvé – Adrienne Lecouvreur

Poetry
Matthew Arnold – The Strayed Reveller
Petrus Augustus de Genestet – De Sint-Nicolaasavond (Saint Nicholas's Eve)
Elias Lönnrot (compiler) – Kalevala (new version)
Edgar Allan Poe – "Annabel Lee", "Eldorado", "The Bells", "A Dream Within a Dream"

Non-fiction
John Mitchell Kemble – History of the Saxons in England
Søren Kierkegaard (as Anti-Climacus) – The Sickness Unto Death (Sygdommen til Døden)
Francis Parkman – The Oregon Trail
Thomas Phillips – Wales, the Language, Social Condition, Moral Character, and Religious Opinions of the People, considered in their relation to Education...
John Ruskin – The Seven Lamps of Architecture
William Smith – Dictionary of Greek and Roman Biography and Mythology
Henry David Thoreau – Resistance to Civil Government
George Ticknor – A History of Spanish Literature
Chandos Wren-Hoskyns – A Short Inquiry into the History of Agriculture in Mediæval and Modern Times

Births
January 9 – Laura Kieler (née Petersen), Norwegian novelist and dramatic inspiration (died 1932)
January 22 – August Strindberg, Swedish dramatist (died 1912)
February 18 – Alexander Kielland, Norwegian novelist (died 1906)
February 27 – Václav Beneš Třebízský, Czech novelist (died 1884)
March 10 — Mary Evelyn Hitchcock, American author and explorer (died 1920)
April 1 — Mary K. Buck, Bohemian-born American author (died 1901)
April 24
Emma Whitcomb Babcock, American litterateur and author (died 1926)
Helen Taggart Clark, American columnist, short story writer, and poet (died 1918)
June 9 – Karl Tanera, German military writer and novelist (died 1904)
July 22 – Emma Lazarus, American poet (died 1887)
July 30 – Lettie S. Bigelow, American poet and author (died 1906)
August 8 – Hume Nisbet, Scottish thriller writer, poet and artist (died 1923)
August 9 – Amy Catherine Walton (née Deck, writing as Mrs. O. F. Walton), English writer of Christian children's books (died 1939)
August 23 – W. E. Henley, English poet (died 1903)
August 30 – J. M. Dent, English publisher (died 1926)
September 3 – Sarah Orne Jewett, American writer (died 1909)
October 7 – James Whitcomb Riley, American writer and poet (died 1916)
October 31 – Marie Louise Andrews, American writer and editor (died 1891)
December 16– Mary Hartwell Catherwood, American author and poet (died 1902)
November 24 – Frances Hodgson Burnett, English children's writer and playwright (died 1924)
date unknown
Harriet Abbott Lincoln Coolidge, American philanthropist, author and reformer (died 1902)
Elisabeth Cavazza, American author, journalist, and music critic (died 1926)

Deaths

January 6 – Hartley Coleridge, English poet and critic (alcohol-related, born 1796)
February 8 – France Prešeren, Slovenian poet (liver disease, born 1800)
February 19 – Bernard Barton, English Quaker poet (born 1784)
May 22 – Maria Edgeworth, Anglo-Irish novelist (born 1768)
May 28 – Anne Brontë, English novelist and poet (tuberculosis, born 1820)
June 4 – Marguerite Gardiner, Countess of Blessington, Irish novelist and literary hostess (born 1789)
July 7 – Goffredo Mameli, Italian poet (infection from bayonet wound, born 1827)
July 12 – Horace (Horatio) Smith, English poet and novelist (born 1799)
July 25 – James Kenney, English dramatist (born 1780)
July 27 – Charlotte von Ahlefeld, German novelist (born 1781)
July 31 – Sándor Petőfi, Hungarian poet and revolutionary (probably killed in Battle of Segesvár, born 1823)
August 25 – Adele Schopenhauer, German novelist and paper-cut artist (born 1797)
October 7 – Edgar Allan Poe, American poet, short story writer and critic (born 1809)

References

 
Years of the 19th century in literature